The Electric Aircraft Corporation ElectraFlyer-ULS is an American electric ultralight motor glider, designed by Randell Fishman and produced by the Electric Aircraft Corporation of Cliffside Park, New Jersey, introduced in late 2012. The aircraft is supplied complete and ready-to-fly.

Design and development
The ElectraFlyer-ULS was designed to comply with the US FAR 103 Ultralight Vehicles rules, including the category's  empty weight limit.

The design features a cantilever mid-wing, a single-seat under a bubble canopy, a twin boom tail, fixed tricycle landing gear and a single electric motor in pusher configuration.

The aircraft is made from carbon fiber and foam composite materials. The motor and drive train are supplied by the Electric Aircraft Corporation in the US, while the airframe is built under contract by Airsport in the Czech Republic and is adapted from an existing design, the Airsport Song.

The drivetrain includes a Fishman-designed  motor, electronic controller and 3.3 kWh LiPo battery pack. An additional 3.3 kWh battery pack is a US$5,000 option, which gives a two-hour endurance. A two-bladed fixed pitch propeller is standard equipment, but a folding carbon fiber propeller is optional.

Specifications (ElectraFlyer-ULS)

References

External links

ULS
2010s United States ultralight aircraft
Single-engined pusher aircraft
Electric aircraft